Mohamed Ali Fourchette (1950–1992) was a prominent Djiboutian vocalist and instrumentalist.

History
Mohamed Ali Fourchette was born in 1950 in Djibouti, French Somaliland. He hails from Issa, Somali parents. Mohamed's involvement with music began at a very early age, with him first taking up singing during childhood. He later started to play the guitar. He went on stage for the first time in 1965 at the age of 15 with Abdi Bow Bow and Abdo Xamar Qoodh. He was shortly afterwards inducted to the Gacan Macan. In the 1970s, Fourchette sang famous patriotic song called Gobanimo meaning independence against the French colonization.

He died in Peltier Hospital in Djibouti City, Djibouti.

Singles
 Gobanimo
 Dhamee Allaahayoow
 Ma Dhamaystirno
 Walaalayaal
 Maw liihii Na Oumaa
 Guusha
 Masiibo lugaley

See also
Music of Djibouti

References

External links
 Heeesaha Mohamed ali fourchette

20th-century Djiboutian male singers
1950 births
1992 deaths